Plaxiphora obtecta is a large chiton in the family Mopaliidae, endemic to New Zealand, where it is most often found on the West Coast of the North Island. It is called Haka-hiwihiwi by some Māori and was likely a food source.

Description and habitat
It has a broad dark brown girdle dotted with small short bristles, and reduced dark green valves, sometimes with a paler stripe down the centre. It is frequent around the holdfasts of algae and in rock crevices around the low intertidal zone, usually on exposed coasts.

References

Mopaliidae
Chitons of New Zealand
Molluscs described in 1893